Ammalo helops is a moth of the family Erebidae first described by Pieter Cramer in 1775. It is found in Mexico, Guatemala, Costa Rica, Honduras, Panama, Jamaica, Cuba, Haiti, Grenada, Trinidad, Amazonas, Brazil, Venezuela, Suriname, Peru and Colombia.

References

Moths described in 1775
Phaegopterina
Moths of North America
Moths of South America
Taxa named by Pieter Cramer